David M. Farhat is a Liberian politician and member of the Free Democratic Party (FDP).

Running as the FDP presidential candidate in the 11 October 2005 elections, Farhat placed 16th out of 22 candidates, receiving 0.5% of the vote. He was Minister of Finance of Liberia from 1988 to 1989.

References

Living people
Year of birth missing (living people)
Candidates for President of Liberia
Free Democratic Party (Liberia) politicians
Finance Ministers of Liberia
20th-century Liberian politicians